"Not OK" (stylized in all lowercase) is the twelfth single by the Bay Area collective Peach Tree Rascals released on April 30, 2020 by Homemade Projects and 10K Projects.

Background and composition 
The song uses the Roland TR-808 alongside acoustic guitars while the group touches on internal conflict and escapism. The song has been described as "reminiscent of an Usher era emotional cut while maintaining a unique and modern flare." The band has said that "[Not OK] is a song we wrote from the perspective of wanting to escape from a moment because you’re feeling too bad to actually be in the present. The song is almost trippy. It’s like being in another dimension. Sometimes when things are rough and I need to escape my thoughts, I do anything I can to get to that other place in my mind, no matter how strange it is, to escape my own mind."

Music video 

The music video premiered exclusively on MTV News and uses blurred shots and lighting to convey the feeling of loneliness. It features singer-rapper Tarrek Abdel-Khaliq wondering in the night through parking lots, cityscapes, and the middle of the street while wearing a traffic cone. Due to the COVID-19 pandemic, the group did not have additional support for the video, only riding in a car and randomly taping the video, which producer Dominic Pizano notes is "how we shoot a lot of our stuff."

References 

Peach Tree Rascals songs
2020 singles